The 1931 Mississippi State Teachers Yellow Jackets football team was an American football team that represented the Mississippi State Teachers College (now known as the University of Southern Mississippi) as a member of the Southern Intercollegiate Athletic Association during the 1931 college football season. In their first year under head coach Pooley Hubert, the team compiled a 2–5 record.

Schedule

References

Mississippi State Teachers
Southern Miss Golden Eagles football seasons
Mississippi State Teachers Yellow Jackets football